The Toothy conger (Bathycongrus odontostomus) is an eel in the family Congridae (conger/garden eels). It was described by Henry Weed Fowler in 1934, originally under the genus Uranoconger. It is a marine, deep water-dwelling eel which is known from the western Indian and southwestern Pacific Ocean, including the Philippines and Indonesia. It is known to dwell at a depth of 886 metres. Males can reach a maximum total length of 4.3 centimetres.

References

Bathycongrus
Fish described in 1934